The 2022 Japan Golf Tour was a series of professional golf tournaments organised by the Japan Golf Tour Organization.

Response to LIV Golf
Following a statement produced by the Japan Golf Tour Organization on 1 October 2022, they outlined their position in regards to the ongoing dispute between LIV Golf and the PGA Tour and their alliance; the European Tour (DP World Tour). They stated that it would be beneficial to the Japan Golf Tour that they remained in a neutral position. However, they also came to the conclusion that they could potentially be better off siding with the PGA Tour, giving players in Asia a pathway to playing opportunities in the United States, as the Asian Tour has already struck an amicable relationship with LIV Golf, giving their players playing opportunities in the LIV Golf League via the International Series.

In December, a new agreement with the PGA Tour and European Tour was announced. As part of the deal, from 2023 onwards the top three on the Japan Golf Tour's season-ending money list earned status to play on the European Tour for the following season.

Schedule
The following table lists official events during the 2022 season.

Unofficial events
The following events were sanctioned by the Japan Golf Tour, but did not carry official money, nor were wins official.

Money list
The money list was based on prize money won during the season, calculated in Japanese yen. The top three players on the tour (not otherwise exempt) earned status to play on the 2023 European Tour.

Notes

References

External links

Japan Golf Tour
Japan Golf Tour
Golf Tour